Xanthophyllum purpureum is a plant in the family Polygalaceae. The specific epithet  is from the Latin meaning "purple", referring to the flowers.

Description
The smooth bark is whitish or brown. The flowers are purple to rose-violet, drying orange-red. The wood is used in construction in Kalimantan.

Distribution and habitat
Xanthophyllum purpureum is endemic to Borneo. Its habitat is mixed dipterocarp forests or lower montane forests from sea-level to  altitude.

References

purpureum
Endemic flora of Borneo
Plants described in 1938